Waterworks is an outdoor fountain and sculpture by Douglas Hollis, installed in Seattle's Cal Anderson Park, in the U.S. state of Washington.

References

Capitol Hill, Seattle
Fountains in Washington (state)
Outdoor sculptures in Seattle